Lee Joon-gi (born 17 April 1982) is a South Korean actor, singer, dancer, and model. He rose to fame on his first leading role playing a clown in the critically acclaimed film The King and the Clown (2005) and gained further recognition in the romantic comedy My Girl (2005−06). Since then, he has diversified into other genres such as historical dramas (sageuk) and action thrillers. He is also known for his roles in Iljimae (2008), Arang and the Magistrate (2012), Moon Lovers: Scarlet Heart Ryeo (2016), Lawless Lawyer (2018), and  Flower of Evil (2020). 

The popularity of his work overseas, especially in Asia, have established him as a top Hallyu star.

Early life
Lee Joon-gi was born in Busan, spent his schooling years in nearby Changwon. He first became interested in the performing arts as a high school student after watching a performance of Hamlet. After finishing high school, he went against his parents' wishes for him to enter university and moved to Seoul to pursue a career in the entertainment industry. For the next several years, Lee worked at various part-time jobs such as waiting tables while auditioning for roles and also debuted as a print and commercial model in 2001. He was accepted into the Seoul Arts College on a scholarship and graduated in 2007.

Career

2005: King and the Clown and rising fame

After bit-part roles in several dramas and films, Lee had his first major acting role in the 2005 film The King and the Clown, in which he played the historical figure Gong-gil, an effeminate clown in the Joseon Dynasty. The film, which achieved both critical and commercial success, propelled the then-unknown actor into Asia-wide stardom. Apart from winning numerous Best Newcomer recognition at the Korean Film Awards, Grand Bell Awards and Baeksang Art Awards, Lee also won the Best Actor Award at the Max Movie Awards.

Producer Lee Joon-ik revealed the story of how he chose Lee for The King and the Clown, despite being an unknown and relatively new actor, by just seeing him do handstands, saying, "Just because of handstands, Lee Joon-gi became the person he is today." After the film, Lee became "an icon" of the South Korean "pretty boy" trend. Lee has since tried to downplay this kkonminam image, saying that his character Gong-gil in the film felt like being in foot-irons so he wanted to escape from the image: "After my performance in The King and the Clown, I found myself at the forefront of this ‘pretty boy’ trend, whether or not that was my intention. Suddenly, people were interested in me, and there was all this praise and criticism all at the same time. Everything was just so overwhelming. I felt like I was floating on air." 

Lee was against the halving of screen quotas in South Korea that allows foreign films to be shown in theaters on certain days, while domestic films are allotted another number of days. He believed that without the screen quotas, The King and the Clown would not have been as successful in competing against foreign films.

2006–2007: Overseas popularity
Lee was then cast in SBS's My Girl alongside Lee Da-hae and Lee Dong-wook. The romance comedy series became a hit during its run both domestically and across Asia, further catapulting Lee into Korean Wave stardom.

For his follow-up film Fly, Daddy, Fly, directed by Choi Jong-tae and produced by Dyne Film-Guardtec, he was reportedly paid , relatively low given his rising popularity following King and the Clown. This is because the contract was signed in early December before the film's release when Lee was an unknown actor.
The film garnered much attention and media coverage among Chinese viewers.

In 2007, Lee filmed a joint Korea-Japan movie entitled Virgin Snow with Japanese actress Aoi Miyazaki, in which he plays a Korean exchange student. Virgin Snow was successful as it placed 9th at the box office chart and set a new ticket admissions record for a Korean film released in Japan. Lee later received the Rising Star Award at the 27th Hawaii International Film Festival. The same year, he participated in the film May 18, which is based on the events surrounding the Gwangju Massacre of 1980. 18 May achieved excellent box office results, and was later awarded the Gold Orchid Best Feature Film for the year of 2007. However, there was criticism that both of these productions, along with Fly, Daddy, Fly, had "either fallen short of expectations at the box office or cast Lee in minor roles."

Lee also took on his first drama leading role in MBC action drama, Time Between Dog and Wolf, in which he played a vengeful NIS agent with a violent streak. He won the Excellence Award at the 2007 MBC Drama Awards for his performance. Director Kim Jin-min opined some years later that it was a turning point for Lee as the role enabled him to shed his "pretty boy" image and also highlight his martial arts background.

2008–2009: Tourism ambassadorship and contractual dispute

From April to July 2008, Lee played the titular role in SBS's Iljimae, a period-action drama based on Chinese folklore from the Ming dynasty about a masked Robin Hood-esque character during the Joseon era. The final episode achieved a rating of 31.4% viewership, and Lee later received the Top Excellence Award at the 2008 SBS Drama Awards. The drama was also aired in Japan on the channel TV Tokyo.

On 29 July 2008, Lee was chosen as the Ambassador for the 2008 Seoul Hallyu Festival. He was also appointed the first Honorary Legal System Officer since the constitution of the Government Legislation Agency to commemorate their 60th anniversary.

In September 2008, Lee had a contractual dispute with his agency Mentor Entertainment, whom he was signed to since March 2004 in an exclusive contract for five years. Lee countered that he "underwent significant financial damage as the company was poor in dealing with tax affairs and profit distribution" and he is said to have notified them of contract cancellation in February.

On 5 August 2009, Lee was appointed promotional ambassador of the Korea Tourism Organization. The same year, he starred in the comedic-action drama Hero, playing a reporter.

2010–2012: Military service
In February 2010, upon the expiration of Lee's contract with Mentor Entertainment, he signed with a newly established independent agency, JG Company.

On 3 May 2010, Lee enlisted in the Republic of Korea Army to serve his mandatory military service. He first underwent five weeks of basic training at Nonsan military training camp, earning top scores in marksmanship, and was later drafted into active duty. He was assigned to the public relations department of the Ministry of National Defense He had initially applied for a postponement because he was in the midst of shooting Grand Prix with actress Kim Tae-hee, and was cast to star in television drama Faith. He was also chosen to represent Korea as a goodwill ambassador at the 2010 Shanghai Expo. However, Military Manpower Administration declined and sent a final notice for enlistment, leading him to pull out of both projects. 

In August, Lee co-starred with fellow actor Ju Ji-hoon in military musical, Voyage of Life to commemorate the 60th anniversary of the Korean War. The musical was also co-produced by the Ministry of National Defense and Korea Musical Theatre Association, and was shown from 21 to 29 August in the National Theater of Korea. After serving 21 months of active duty, Lee was discharged on 16 February 2012 from the Defense Media Agency at Yongsan-dong, Yongsan-gu, Seoul. On the day when he was discharged, Lee held a fan meeting, "Reunion JG" at Sangmyung Art Center, Seoul. This was followed by fan event tour of Japan, titled Coming Back in Nagoya, Yokohama and Osaka from 16 to 19 March.

2012–2013: Comeback
In May 2012, Lee co-starred with Shin Min-a in MBC's period horror-romance Arang and the Magistrate, his first project after being discharged. The series was a success and became the most expensive drama to be sold to Japan by MBC. Lee was later recognized at the Seoul International Drama Awards, winning the Outstanding Korean Drama Actor award.

On 27 September 2012, Lee Joon Gi's JG Style was shown on Mnet Japan, documenting Lee's comeback to the entertainment industry. The series was later awarded the Grand Prize in the Korean wave category at the Skapa Award 2012 in Japan.

In 2013, Lee starred in the action thriller Two Weeks, playing a father struggling to save his daughter from leukemia while fighting a murder charge. He received Top Excellence Award in the male category at the 2nd APAN Star Awards.

2014–present: Historical dramas and action roles
Lee signed with a new management agency, Namoo Actors. He then starred in the period drama Gunman in Joseon (2014) and won critical acclaim for his acting and action scenes, winning the Outstanding Korean Drama Actor for a second time at the Seoul International Drama Awards. The drama topped the ratings for its time slot and also garnered attention overseas, especially in China where it surpassed 200 million views in a month on Tencent QQ's video-viewing platform. This was followed by the vampire romance series Scholar Who Walks the Night in 2015, which earned Lee a "Top Ten Stars" award at the MBC Drama Awards. The same year, he was cast in his first Chinese movie, Never Said Goodbye.

In January 2016, Lee was cast in the lead role of Wang So in Moon Lovers: Scarlet Heart Ryeo, a Korean remake of the Chinese television series, Scarlet Heart. The 20-episode drama, budgeted at US$13 million, premiered on 29 August 2016. The production was not well received domestically, but averaged 100 million cumulative views per episode during its simulcast on the Chinese video hosting site Youku and led to a rise in popularity for Lee in China. On 1 November, Lee hosted a free fan meeting titled “My Love Lee Joon-gi” where fans were able to watch the final episode of Moon Lovers with him in attendance.

In October 2016, Lee signed as a new model for Lotte Duty Free Shop. He also co-starred in a promotional web drama titled 7 First Kisses for the company. Lee then made his Hollywood debut with an appearance in the sixth and final installment of the Resident Evil series titled, Resident Evil: The Final Chapter which was released worldwide in January 2017.

In 2017, Lee starred in tvN's crime procedural drama Criminal Minds, based on the American series of the same name. His convincing acting performance as a criminal profiler garnered him plaudits from critics and viewers.

In 2018, Lee returned to tvN and was cast in Lawless Lawyer, his first legal drama and the first time he has portrayed a lawyer. He reunited with director Kim Jin-min, who previously worked with him in Time Between Dog and Wolf.

In 2020, Lee was cast in the tvN thriller melodrama The Flower of Evil, reuniting him with Criminal Minds co-star Moon Chae-won. He was praised for his chemistry with Moon portraying a married couple. Lee's name was the most searched keyword on domestic search engines for three consecutive weeks, based on data compiled by Good Data Corporation. For his performance, Lee was nominated for Best Actor – Television at 57th Baeksang Arts Awards.

In 2022, Lee made a comeback to the small screen with SBS drama Again My Life, his return to terrestrial television in six years since 2016.

Personal life
Lee enjoys learning and practicing different types of martial arts during his spare time. His father had signed him up for martial arts lessons as a child to keep him out of trouble and he continued practicing into adulthood, mostly to prepare for specific roles. Due to his proficiency in taekwondo and several other forms of martial arts, he rarely uses a stunt double for fight scenes and is recognized within the industry as one of the country's top action stars.

Filmography

Film

Television series

Web series

Reality show

Musical

Discography

Albums

Soundtrack

Bibliography

Ambassadorship

Awards and nominations

References

External links

South Korean male film actors
South Korean male television actors
South Korean male models
South Korean male taekwondo practitioners
Male actors from Busan
1982 births
Living people
South Korean Roman Catholics
21st-century South Korean male actors
MAMA Award winners
21st-century South Korean  male singers
South Korean male dancers
South Korean male web series actors
Best New Actor Paeksang Arts Award (film) winners
Jeonju Yi clan